Lá (Irish for "Day"; later known as Lá Nua, Irish for "New Day") was an Irish-language daily newspaper based in Belfast. It was the first daily newspaper in Ireland to be published in Irish. Lá Nua belonged to the Belfast Media Group, and was a sister paper of the Andersonstown News.

Established in the 1980s it developed from a broadsheet format to a European tabloid size. With a print circulation of a few thousand and an active website, Lá catered for the Irish language community throughout the island and abroad. It had a range of supplements, including Arts, Education, Sport, Business and Entertainment.

It had five editors, including founders Gearóid Ó Cairealláin and Eoghan Ó Néill, Ciarán Ó Pronntaigh, Concubhar Ó Liatháin and finally Dónall Mac Giolla Chóill (Feb-Dec 2008).

In October 2008, it was announced that the newspaper would cease publication at the end of 2008. Foras na Gaeilge decided not to further fund the paper due to its insufficient circulation and availability. The final issue was published on 19 December 2008.

The literary section was carried in the Andersonstown News for a few months edited by Dónall Mac Giolla Chóill and later by Ciarán Ó Pronntaigh, and all the articles were available on the official site, nuacht.com, until the site was finally taken offline.

See also
List of Irish-language media
Scúp, TV drama about an Irish-language newspaper in Belfast

References

Daily newspapers published in the United Kingdom
Defunct newspapers published in Ireland
Irish-language newspapers
Mass media in Belfast
Newspapers published in Northern Ireland
Publications established in 1984
Publications disestablished in 2008